The Madrid Stock Exchange General Index (IGBM) is a capitalization-weighted stock market index that measures the performance of a selected number of continuous market stocks. It is the principal index for the Bolsa de Madrid (Madrid Stock Exchange) and represents the construction, financial services, communications, consumer, capital/intermediate goods, energy and market service sectors. The index was developed with a base value of 100 as of December 31, 1985.

IBEX

The IBEX 35 is a market capitalization weighted index comprising the 35 most liquid Spanish stocks traded in the Madrid Stock Exchange General Index and is reviewed twice annually. There are some other indices like the IBEX TOP DIVIDENDO which represents the stocks with the highest dividend.

New Market

Abengoa
Amper
Avanzit
Befesa 
Indra
Jazztel
Zeltia

Rest of companies (Mercado Continuo and Latibex)

Adolfo Domínguez
ALFA
América Móvil
Aracruz Celulose
Arcelor-Mittal
Astroc Mediterráneo
CAF
Azkoyen
Banco Bradesco
Banco Cuscatlán
Banco de Andalucía
Banco de Castilla
Banco de Chile
Banco de Crédito Balear
Banco de Galicia
Barón de Ley
Banco de Valencia
Banco de Vasconia
Bayer Hispania
Banco Guipuzcoano
Banco Pastor
Banco Río de la Plata
BBVA Banco Francés
Bolsas y Mercados Españoles
Bodegas Riojanas
Bradespar
Braskem
CVNE
Campofrío
Cementos Portland Valderrivas
CEMIG
CEPSA
CIE Automotive
CLEOP
COPEL
Corporación Financiera Alba
Corporación Dermoestética
Distribución y Servicio D&S
Duro Felguera
Dinamia (formerly Dogi SA)
Dogi International Fabrics
EADS
Ebro Puleva
Electricidad de Caracas
Elecnor
Eletrobrás
Enersis
Ercros
Española del Zinc
EUROPAC
Europistas
Faes Farma
Funespaña
GAMA
Gesiuris
Casas GEO
Gerdau
Grupo Catalana Occidente
Grupo Elektra
Grupo Empresarial ENCE
Grupo Inmocaral
Grupo Modelo
Grifols
Hullas del Coto Cortés
Iberpapel
Inbesòs
INDO
Inmobiliaria Colonial
Inmobiliaria Urbis
Informes y Proyectos
La Seda de Barcelona
Lingotes Especiales
Logista
Mecalux
Miquel y Costas
Montebalito
NATRA
Net Serviços de Comunicação
Nicolás Correa
OHL
Parquesol Inmobiliaria Y Proyectos
Paternina
Pescanova
Petrobras
Prim
PRISA
Prosegur
Reno De Medici
Renta Corporación
Riofisa
Santander Puerto Rico
Sare Privanza
Service Point Solutions
SNIACE
Sol Meliá
SOS Cuétara
Sotogrande
Suzano Bahia Sul Papel e Celulose
Suzano Petroquímica
Tableros de Fibras
TAVEX
Técnicas Reunidas
Telepizza
Telmex
Testa
TUBACEX
Tubos Reunidos
Tudor
TV Azteca
Unipapel
Uralita
URBAS
Usiminas
Vale do Rio Doce
Vidrala
Viscofan
Vocento
VOLCAN Compañía Minera
Vueling Airlines

See also
 Exchange-traded fund
 Index (Economics)
 Index fund
 Index investing
 Passive management
 :Category:IBEX 35

References

www.bolsamadrid.es
www.bloomberg.com
Reuters page for .SMSI

Spanish stock market indices